Morris Krok (28 April 1931 – October 2005) was a South African author, publisher and health educator.

Biography 

Background

Morris Krok was born in Johannesburg and brought up in Durban, South Africa. As a young man, he started to seek solutions for his health problems and was influenced by natural healing writers of the 20th century such as Vincent Priessnitz, Louis Kuhne, Harry Benjamin, Arnold Ehret, Dugald Semple, George R. Clements, Walter Siegmeister, Essie Honiball and Johnny Lovewisdom. He also studied new age, occult, esoteric, yogic, spiritual and metaphysical writings from the East. Krok migrated to California to develop his work and writings, dedicating his life to the quest for knowledge about health, vitality and higher consciousness. A regular marathon runner, Krok died from cancer of the leg in 2005, blaming "his problem on his terrible diet in his youth and on cooked food temptations from family".

Beliefs

In the 1950s, a popular South African newspaper featured a story about Krok’s belief that fruit was the ideal food for humankind. In the 1990s and 2000s, David Klein Ph.D., publisher of Living Nutrition, chronicled Krok's famous sayings including "Man will always get colds if he persists in eating large quantities of mucous forming foods in the form of starch, dairy products and animal fats." and "Health is the balance between assimilation and elimination.” in the magazine. Central to Krok's thinking was that mucusless foods held the key to good health. In the article, A Yogic Perspective he describes how "To heal and avoid illness, one must alkalinize the body through a diet of predominately raw fruits and vegetables."

Writings

Krok wrote books on detoxification, internal purification, natural living, self-healing, fruitarianism, fasting, living foods, raw nutrition, physical culture, hatha yoga, meditation, deep breathing, higher consciousness, radiant energy, life extension and vitalism. As well as being an author, Krok published several books by other authors including Johanna Brandt, Otto Abramowski and Theos Bernard, through Essence of Health Publishers.

Golden Path

Krok's book Golden Path To Rejuvenation described how a non-toxic diet and the osmotic pressure of rainwater could detoxify and purify the membranes and tissues of the body. Krok believed that internal purification, was the direct and most effective way for a longer and youthful life. He described how not everything humans eat is used by the body, showing how accumulated wastes and toxins caused by an unnatural diet and other substances, result in illness and premature ageing. His internal purification programme was designed to help increase longevity and remain youthful. He believed internal cleansing in conjunction with plant foods was the 'golden path'. The book also explained the yogic vomit technique, a central part of the detoxification regime he endorsed.

Legacy

Krok was one of a series of 20th-century writers who wrote about fruitarianism, raw nutrition, fasting, detoxification, yoga and higher consciousness. His contemporaries included Brian Clement Ph.D, Dr. Douglas N. Graham, Viktoras Kulvinskas and Robert Gray. Authors who have endorsed Krok's writings in their books include John McCabe, Joe Alexander, Gary Null, Benito De Donno and David Wolfe.

Criticisms

Morris Krok advocated a fruitarian diet in his writings as the optimal diet and described how at stages during his life, he lived "only on fruits". It is claimed that he later advised against a diet of "only fruit" however, it was subsequently reported that Krok's diet consisted of "just fruit".

Writings

Books and booklets written by Morris Krok, many published through Essence Of Health Publishers:

Amazing New Health System: Inner Clean Way, 1978
Amazing New Health System: Inner Clean Way, Essence of Health, Wandsbeck, South Africa, 2001, 
Cream of Yoga, 1987 (booklet)
Diary Of A Health & Truth Seeker, 1967, 1969
Diet Health And Living On Air, 1973
El Frugivorismo de Durban, Barcelona: Cuadernos De Naturismo, 1980
Formula For Long Life, 1967, 1977 and 2001 (originally From The Deathbed To Boisterous Health)
From The Deathbed To Boisterous Health, 1962, 1963
Fruit: The Food And Medicine For Man, 1961 (alternate title The Conquest Of Disease) 
Fruit: The Food And Medicine For Man, Connecticut: O'mangod, 1967
Golden Path To Rejuvenation: Life’s Most Important Knowledge, 1964
Hatha Yoga In Its Moods Multivarious, 1959
Hatha Yoga: The Vibrant Science Of Life, 1975
Health, Diet, and Living on Air (1964)
Health Truths Eternal, 1964
Health Truths Eternal (booklet)
Metaphysical Diary, 1960s
Mystic Story (booklet)
The Greater Miracle of Life, 1964
The Kindred Soul: Teachings Of Eternal Truth, 1968
Pathway To Truth, 1974
Raw Juice Therapy & Self-Help, 1967
Science of Natural Healing (booklet), 1961
Soul Knowledge, 1960s (formerly Revelations Of The New Age)
The Conquest Of Disease, 1961
The Fog Lifts - autobiography (unpublished)

Essence Of Health publications

Fast Way To Health - Frank Mccoy
Fruitarian Diet & Physical Rejuvenation - Otto Abramowski
Fruitarian System Of Healing - Otto Abramowski, 1976
Fruitarianism: Compassionate Way To Transform Health - Hannah Hurnard
Garden Of The Lord - Hannah Hurnard
Gardening Without Digging - Albert Guest, 1973
Hatha Yoga - Theos Bernard, 2001, 
Heaven Lies Within Us - Theos Bernard, 2002, 
I Live On Fruit - Essie Honiball, 2002
My Healing Secret
The Physiological Enigma of Woman: The Mystery Of Menstruation - Raymond Bernard
Prenatal Origin Of Genius - Raymond W. Bernard, (Foreword and Edited by Morris Krok), 1962
The Grape Cure - Joanna Brandt
Yoga Gave Me Superior Health (Heaven Lies Within Us) - Theos Bernard
Yoga System Of Health - Yogi Vithaldas

Books cited by Morris Krok

Autogbiography Of A Yogi - Paramhansa Yogananda
Doctor’s Disease And Health - Cyril Scott
Everybody’s Guide To Nature Cure - Harry Benjamin
Folk Medicine - DeForest Clinton Jarvis
Game Of Life - Florence Shinn
Hatha Yoga - Theos Benard
Healing By Water - T. Hartley Hennessy
Heaven Lies Within Us - Theos Bernard
Mucusless Diet Healing System - Arnold Ehret
Nature The Healer - Vera Richter
New Science Of Healing - Louis Kuhn
A Plea for The Order of the Golden Age - H. J. Williams
Pacifying Panicking People -
Provoker - John Toby
Raw Eating - Aterhov T. Hovannessian
Science Of Breath - Yogi Ramacharaka
Sunfood Way To Health - Dugald Semple
Why Grow Old - Tony Officer
Why slim - Khaled Hasan
Street pocker - Kaleemi

References

External links 
Vibrance/Living Nutrition Magazine

1931 births
2005 deaths
South African nutritionists
Raw foodists
Pseudoscientific diet advocates
20th-century American non-fiction writers
20th-century American male writers